The 1999 All-Ireland Senior Hurling Championship Final was the 112th All-Ireland Final and the culmination of the 1999 All-Ireland Senior Hurling Championship, an inter-county hurling tournament for the top teams in Ireland. The match was held at Croke Park, Dublin, on 12 September 1999, between Cork and Kilkenny. The Leinster champions lost to their Munster opponents on a score line of 0-13 to 0-12.
Cork had trailed by a point at half time, 0-05 to 0-04, after playing the better hurling. Then Kilkenny pulled into a four-point lead in the second half, they were 0-11 to 0-08 ahead before Cork scored five unanswered points with Kilkenny only managing one more point from a Henry Shefflin free. Cork, captained by Mark Landers and managed by Jimmy Barry-Murphy held out to win their first All Ireland title since 1990.

It was Cork's 28th All-Ireland hurling title.

References

All-Ireland Senior Hurling Championship Final
All-Ireland Senior Hurling Championship Final, 1999
All-Ireland Senior Hurling Championship Final
All-Ireland Senior Hurling Championship Finals
Cork county hurling team matches
Kilkenny GAA matches